Paweł Teclaf (born 18 June 2003) is a Polish chess player. He was awarded the title of International Master by FIDE in 2019.

He qualified to play in the Chess World Cup 2021 where he played D Gukesh in the first round. In december 2021, he became a media sensation after a video of him went viral at the Fide world blitz championship in which in a particular round against GM Tigran Petrosian he blundered into a mating net and fell off his chair due to disappointment from the loss. He became known as the chair boy.

References

External links 
 
 Paweł Teclaf chess games at 365Chess.com
 
  Viral video of teclaf on youtube

2003 births
Living people
Polish chess players